Brahmi may refer to:

Writing systems
 Brahmi script
 Brahmi numerals

Plants
 Bacopa monnieri
 Centella asiatica (in North India)

People
 Azzedine Brahmi (born 1966), Algerian long-distance runner
 Brahmanandam ("Brahmi", born 1956), Telugu comedian
 Maroua Brahmi, Tunisian athlete
 Mohamed Brahmi (1955–2013), Tunisian politician
 Said Brahmi (born 1995), Qatari footballer
 Tarik Brahmi (born 1968), Canadian engineer and politician

Other
 Brahmani, also known as Brahmi, one of the seven Mother Goddesses called Matrikas and consort or Shakti (power) of Hindu creator god, Brahma
 Brahmi (Unicode block)

See also
 Brahmic scripts